Arseny Alavkin (born 1969) is a Russian Chess Grandmaster titled in 2010.

References

External links
 

Arseny Alavkin chess games at 365Chess.com

Chess grandmasters
1969 births
Living people